Sérgio Eduardo Castriani C.S.Sp. (31 May 1954 – 3 March 2021) was a Brazilian Roman Catholic archbishop.

Castriani was born in Brazil and was ordained to the priesthood in 1978. He served as coadjutor bishop of the Roman Catholic Territorial Prelature of Tefé, Brazil, from 1998 to 2000 and was bishop of the territorial prefecture from 2000 to 2012. He then served as archbishop of the Roman Catholic Archdiocese of Manaus, Brazil from 2012 to 2019.

Castriani died from complications from sepsis on 3 March 2021.

References

1954 births
2021 deaths
21st-century Roman Catholic archbishops in Brazil
Deaths from sepsis
Roman Catholic bishops of Tefé
Holy Ghost Fathers
Brazilian Roman Catholic archbishops